Alimony is a legal obligation on a person to provide financial support to his or her spouse before or after marital separation or divorce.

Alimony may also refer to:

Alimony (1917 film), American silent drama film
Alimony (1924 film), American silent drama film
Alimony (1949 film), American crime film
"Alimony", a song by "Weird Al" Yankovic from the album Even Worse

See also 
 Child support, an ongoing, periodic payment made by a parent for the financial benefit of a child following the end of a marriage or other relationship